Mike Banner (born October 20, 1984) is an American former professional soccer player who is currently retired.

Career

College
Born in Washington, D.C., Banner attended Gonzaga College High School and began his collegiate soccer career at Georgetown University in 2002.  He played in 18 matches during his freshman season for the Hoyas, starting 13 games, but transferred to Southern Illinois University, Edwardsville the following season. After sitting out a season he went on to play three more seasons for the Cougars, appearing in 56 matches during his career, scoring 18 goals along the way, and being awarded first team NCAA All-American.

Professional
Banner was drafted in the third round, 34th overall, by the Chicago Fire in the 2007 MLS SuperDraft. He stayed with Chicago for five seasons. In January 2012, the club announced that Banner would not return for the 2012 season.
 He later signed with the Illinois Piasa indoor soccer team.
 In March 2012, Banner signed a two-year contract with Finnish Veikkausliiga side FF Jaro. 

Banner signed with FC Edmonton ahead of the 2014 season.

References

External links
 

1984 births
Living people
American soccer players
American expatriate soccer players
Georgetown Hoyas men's soccer players
SIU Edwardsville Cougars men's soccer players
Chicago Fire FC players
FF Jaro players
FC Edmonton players
Kokkolan Palloveikot players
Gonzaga College High School alumni
Expatriate footballers in Finland
Major League Soccer players
Chicago Fire FC draft picks
Expatriate soccer players in Canada
Veikkausliiga players
North American Soccer League players
Soccer players from Washington, D.C.
Association football midfielders
American expatriate sportspeople in Canada
American expatriate sportspeople in Finland